The Humour Is on Me Now is an album by Ronnie Drew, released in 1999.

This album was produced by Mike Hanrahan in 1999 and features a number of traditional musicians, including John Sheahan. Also featured are Ronnie Drew's recordings of two songs by Patrick Kavanagh – "on Raglan Road" and "If Ever You Go To Dublin Town".

Track listing
 "The Humour Is On Me Now"
 "Always Remember"
 "Since Maggie Went Away"
 "Red Roses for Me"
 "Limerick Rake"
 "Clearing a Space"
 "Raglan Road"
 "If Ever You Go to Dublin Town"
 "Courtin' In the Kitchen"
 "Two Island Swans"
 "The Dunes"
 "The Black Velvet Band"
 "The Dingle Puck Goat"
 "We Had It All"

1999 albums
Ronnie Drew albums